The A51 is a road in England which runs for 85 miles (137 km) from Chester, Cheshire to Kingsbury, North Warwickshire.

Route
It takes on the following route:
Chester
Vicars Cross
Littleton
Tarvin (bypass opened 1984)
Duddon
Clotton
Tarporley (merges briefly with A49)
Nantwich
Woore
Stone (merges briefly with A34)
Sandon
Weston
Great Haywood
Little Haywood
Rugeley (bypass opened 2007 )
Lichfield
Tamworth
Kingsbury

Road purpose
The A51 is used by some long-distance traffic as an alternative to the M6 motorway, which is prone to congestion through Birmingham. The nearby M6 Toll motorway now serves a similar function.

History 
Originally the A51 terminated at Two Gates where it met the A5, the road south continuing as the A423.  When the A423 was removed north of Coventry, the A51 was extended to meet the A47 (now B4114). It was cut back to Kingsbury when the A47 was downgraded.

Roads in England
Roads in Cheshire
Transport in Staffordshire
Roads in Warwickshire